The habitability of red dwarf systems is presumed to be determined by a large number of factors from a variety of sources. Modern evidence indicates that planets in red dwarf systems are unlikely to be habitable, due to their low stellar flux, high probability of tidal locking, small circumstellar habitable zones and the high stellar variation experienced by planets of red dwarf stars, impeding their planetary habitability. However, the ubiquity and longevity of red dwarfs are factors which could provide ample opportunity for any possibility of habitability to be realized. As red dwarf stars are by far the most common type of star in the universe, astronomers study how each of the many factors, and the interactions among them, could affect their habitability to learn more about the frequency and most likely locations of extraterrestrial life and intelligence.

A major impediment to life developing in these systems is the intense tidal heating caused by the proximity of planets to their host red dwarfs. Other tidal effects reduce the probability of life around red dwarfs, such as the extreme temperature differences created by one side of habitable-zone planets permanently facing the star, and the other perpetually turned away and lack of planetary axial tilts. Non-tidal factors further reduce the prospects for life in red-dwarf systems, such as extreme stellar variation, spectral energy distributions shifted to the infrared relative to the Sun, and small circumstellar habitable zones due to low light output.

There are, however, a few factors that could increase the likelihood of life on red dwarf planets. Intense cloud formation on the star-facing side of a tidally locked planet may reduce overall thermal flux and drastically reduce equilibrium temperature differences between the two sides of the planet. In addition, the sheer number of red dwarfs statistically increases the probability that there might exist habitable planets orbiting some of them. Red dwarfs account for about 85% of stars in the Milky Way and the vast majority of stars in spiral and elliptical galaxies. There are expected to be tens of billions of super-Earth planets in the habitable zones of red dwarf stars in the Milky Way.

Red dwarf characteristics
Red dwarfs are the smallest, coolest, and most common type of star. Estimates of their abundance range from 70%  of stars in spiral galaxies to more than 90% of all stars in elliptical galaxies, an often quoted median figure being 72–76% of the stars in the Milky Way (known since the 1990s from radio telescopic observation to be a barred spiral). Red dwarfs are usually defined as being of spectral type M, although some definitions are wider (including also some or all K-type stars). Given their low energy output, red dwarfs are almost never naked-eye visible from Earth: the closest red dwarf to the Sun, Proxima Centauri, is nowhere near visual magnitude. The brightest red dwarf in Earth's night sky, Lacaille 8760 (+6.7) is visible to the naked eye only under ideal viewing conditions.

Research

Luminosity and spectral composition

For years, astronomers have ruled out red dwarfs as potential abodes for life, with masses ranging from roughly 0.08 to 0.60 solar masses. The low masses of the stars cause the nuclear fusion reactions at their cores to proceed exceedingly slowly, giving them luminosities ranging from a maximum of roughly 10 percent that of the Sun to a minimum of just 0.0125 percent. Consequently, any planet orbiting a red dwarf would have to have a low semi-major axis in order to maintain Earth-like surface temperature, from 0.268 astronomical units (AU) for a relatively luminous red dwarf like Lacaille 8760 to 0.032 AU for a smaller star like Proxima Centauri, the nearest star to the Solar System. Such a world would have a year lasting just 3 to 150 days. Much of the low luminosity of a red dwarf falls in the infrared and red part of the electromagnetic spectrum, with lower energy than the yellow light in which the Sun peaks. As a result, photosynthesis on a red dwarf planet would require additional photons to achieve excitation potentials comparable to those needed in Earth photosynthesis for electron transfers, due to the lower average energy level of near-infrared photons compared to visible. Having to adapt to a far wider spectrum to gain the maximum amount of energy, foliage on a habitable red dwarf planet would probably appear black if viewed in visible light.

In addition, because water strongly absorbs red and infrared light, less energy would be available for aquatic life on red dwarf planets. However, a similar effect of preferential absorption by water ice would increase its temperature relative to an equivalent amount of radiation from a Sun-like star, thereby extending the habitable zone of red dwarfs outward.

Another fact that would inhibit habitability is the evolution of the red dwarf stars; as such stars have an extended pre-main sequence phase, their eventual habitable zones would be for around 1 billion years a zone where water was not liquid but in its gaseous state. Thus, terrestrial planets in the actual habitable zones, if provided with abundant surface water in their formation, would have been subject to a runaway greenhouse effect for several hundred million years. During such an early runaway greenhouse phase, photolysis of water vapor would allow hydrogen escape to space and the loss of several Earth oceans of water, leaving a thick abiotic oxygen atmosphere.

Tidal effects 
At the close orbital distances, which planets around red dwarf stars would have to maintain for liquid water to exist at their surfaces, tidal locking to the host star is likely. Tidal locking makes the planet rotate on its axis once every revolution around the star. As a result one side of the planet would eternally face the star and another side would perpetually face away, creating great extremes of temperature.

For many years, it was believed that life on such planets would be limited to a ring-like region known as the terminator, where the star would always appear on or close to the horizon.
It was also believed that efficient heat transfer between the sides of the planet necessitates atmospheric circulation of an atmosphere so thick as to disallow photosynthesis.  Due to differential heating, it was argued, a tidally locked planet would experience fierce winds with permanent torrential rain at the point directly facing the local star, the sub-solar point. In the opinion of one author this makes complex life improbable. Plant life would have to adapt to the constant gale, for example by anchoring securely into the soil and sprouting long flexible leaves that do not snap. Animals would rely on infrared vision, as signaling by calls or scents would be difficult over the din of the planet-wide gale. Underwater life would, however, be protected from fierce winds and flares, and vast blooms of black photosynthetic plankton and algae could support the sea life.

In contrast to the previously bleak picture for life, 1997 studies by Robert Haberle and Manoj Joshi of NASA's Ames Research Center in California have shown that a planet's atmosphere (assuming it included greenhouse gases CO2 and H2O) need only be 100 millibar, or 10% of Earth's atmosphere, for the star's heat to be effectively carried to the night side, a figure well within the bounds of photosynthesis. Research two years later by Martin Heath of Greenwich Community College has shown that seawater, too, could effectively circulate without freezing solid if the ocean basins were deep enough to allow free flow beneath the night side's ice cap. Additionally, a 2010 study concluded that Earth-like water worlds tidally locked to their stars would still have temperatures above  on the night side. Climate models constructed in 2013 indicate that cloud formation on tidally locked planets would minimize the temperature difference between the day and the night side, greatly improving habitability prospects for red dwarf planets. Further research, including a consideration of the amount of photosynthetically active radiation, has suggested that tidally locked planets in red dwarf systems might at least be habitable for higher plants.

The existence of a permanent day side and night side is not the only potential setback for life around red dwarfs. Tidal heating experienced by planets in the habitable zone of red dwarfs less than 30% of the mass of the Sun may cause them to be "baked out" and become "tidal Venuses." Combined with the other impediments to red dwarf habitability, this may make the probability of many red dwarfs hosting life as we know it very low compared to other star types. There may not even be enough water for habitable planets around many red dwarfs; what little water found on these planets, in particular Earth-sized ones, may be located on the cold night side of the planet. In contrast to the predictions of earlier studies on tidal Venuses, though, this "trapped water" may help to stave off runaway greenhouse effects and improve the habitability of red dwarf systems.

Moons of gas giants within a habitable zone could overcome this problem since they would become tidally locked to their primary and not their star, and thus would experience a day-night cycle. The same principle would apply to double planets, which would likely be tidally locked to each other.

Note however that how quickly tidal locking occurs can depend upon a planet's oceans and even atmosphere, and may mean that tidal locking fails to happen even after many Gyrs. Additionally, tidal locking is not the only possible end state of tidal dampening. Mercury, for example, has had sufficient time to tidally lock, but is in a 3:2 spin orbit resonance.

Variability
Red dwarfs are far more variable and violent than their more stable, larger cousins. Often they are covered in star-spots that can dim their emitted light by up to 40% for months at a time. On Earth life has adapted in many ways to the similarly reduced temperatures of the winter. Life may survive by hibernating and/or by diving into deep water where temperatures could be more constant. Oceans would potentially freeze over during extreme cold periods. If so, once the dim period ends, the planet's albedo would be higher than it was prior to the dimming. This means more light from the red dwarf would be reflected, which would impede temperatures from recovering, or possibly further reduce planetary temperatures.

At other times, red dwarfs emit gigantic flares that can double their brightness in a matter of minutes. Indeed, as more and more red dwarfs have been scrutinized for variability, more of them have been classified as flare stars to some degree or other. Such variation in brightness could be very damaging for life. Flares might also produce torrents of charged particles that could strip off sizable portions of the planet's atmosphere. Scientists who subscribe to the Rare Earth hypothesis doubt that red dwarfs could support life amid strong flaring. Tidal-locking would probably result in a relatively low planetary magnetic moment. Active red dwarfs that emit coronal mass ejections (CMEs) would bow back the magnetosphere until it contacted the planetary atmosphere. As a result, the atmosphere would undergo strong erosion, possibly leaving the planet uninhabitable.
It was found that red dwarfs have a much lower CME rate as expected from their rotation or flare activity, and large CMEs occur rarely. This suggests that atmospheric erosion is caused mainly by radiation rather than CMEs.

Otherwise, it is suggested that if the planet had a magnetic field, it would deflect the particles from the atmosphere (even the slow rotation of a tidally locked M-dwarf planet—it spins once for every time it orbits its star—would be enough to generate a magnetic field as long as part of the planet's interior remained molten). 
This magnetic field should be much stronger compared to Earth's to give protection against flares of the observed magnitude (10–1000G compared to the terrestrial 0.5G), which is unlikely to be generated.
But actual mathematical models conclude that, even under the highest attainable dynamo-generated magnetic field strengths, exoplanets with masses like that of Earth lose a significant fraction of their atmospheres by the erosion of the exobase's atmosphere by CME bursts and XUV emissions (even those Earth-like planets closer than 0.8 AU, affecting also G and K stars, are prone to losing their atmospheres). Atmospheric erosion even could trigger the depletion of water oceans. Planets shrouded by a thick haze of hydrocarbons like the one on primordial Earth or Saturn's moon Titan might still survive the flares as floating droplets of hydrocarbon are particularly efficient at absorbing ultraviolet radiation.

Another way that life could initially protect itself from radiation, would be remaining underwater until the star had passed through its early flare stage, assuming the planet could retain enough of an atmosphere to sustain liquid oceans. The scientists who wrote the television program "Aurelia" believed that life could survive on land despite a red dwarf flaring. Once life reached onto land, the low amount of UV produced by a quiet red dwarf means that life could thrive without an ozone layer, and thus never need to produce oxygen.

It is worth noting that the violent flaring period of a red dwarf's life cycle is estimated to only last roughly the first 1.2 billion years of its existence. If a planet forms far away from a red dwarf so as to avoid tidal locking, and then migrates into the star's habitable zone after this turbulent initial period, it is possible for life to have a chance to develop.

It has been found that the largest flares happen at high latitudes near the stellar poles so if exoplanets orbits are aligned with the stellar rotation then they are less affected by the flares than previously thought.

Abundance
The major advantage that red dwarfs have over other stars as abodes for life: they produce light energy for a very, very long time. It took 4.5 billion years before humans appeared on Earth, and life as we know it will see suitable conditions for 1.5 billion more years or so. Red dwarfs, by contrast, could exist for trillions of years, because their nuclear reactions are far slower than those of larger stars, meaning that life both would have far longer to evolve and to survive. Furthermore, although the odds of finding a planet in the habitable zone around any specific red dwarf are unknown, the total amount of habitable zone around all red dwarfs combined is likely equal to the total amount around Sun-like stars given their ubiquity. The first super-Earth with a mass of a 3 to 4 times that of Earth's found in the potentially habitable zone of its star is Gliese 581g, and its star, Gliese 581, is indeed a red dwarf. Although tidally locked, it is thought possible that at its terminator liquid water may exist. The planet is thought to have existed for approximately 7 billion years and has a large enough mass to support an atmosphere.

Another possibility could come in the far future, when according to computer simulations a red dwarf becomes a blue dwarf as it is exhausting its hydrogen supply. As this kind of star is more luminous than the previous red dwarf, planets orbiting it that were frozen during the former stage could be thawed during the several billions of years this evolutionary stage lasts (5 billion years, for example, for a  star), giving life an opportunity to appear and evolve.

Water retention
Planets can retain significant amounts of water in the habitable zone of ultra-cool dwarfs, with a sweet spot in the 0.08 – 0.11 M⊙ range, despite FUV-photolysis of water and the XUV-driven escape of hydrogen.

Water worlds orbiting M-dwarfs could have their oceans depleted over the Gyr timescale due to the more intense particle and radiation environments that exoplanets experience in close-in habitable zones. If the atmosphere were to be depleted over the timescale less than Gyr, this could prove to be problematic for the origin of life (abiogenesis) on the planet.

Methane habitable zone

If methane-based life is possible (similar to the hypothetical life on Titan), there would be a second habitable zone further out from the star corresponding to the region where methane is liquid. Titan's atmosphere is transparent to red and infrared light, so more of the light from red dwarfs would be expected to reach the surface of a Titan-like planet.

Frequency of Earth-sized worlds around ultra-cool dwarfs

A study of archival Spitzer data gives the first idea and estimate of how frequent Earth-sized worlds are around ultra-cool dwarf stars: 30–45%. A computer simulation finds that planets that form around stars with similar mass to TRAPPIST-1 (c. 0.084 M⊙) most likely have sizes similar to the Earth's.

In fiction
The following examples of fictional "aliens" existing within Red Dwarf star systems exist:
Ark: In Stephen Baxter's Ark, after planet Earth is completely submerged by the oceans a small group of humans embark on an interstellar journey eventually making it to a planet named Earth III. The planet is cold, tidally locked and the plant life is black (in order to better absorb the light from the red dwarf).
 Draco Tavern: In Larry Niven's Draco Tavern stories, the highly advanced Chirpsithra aliens evolved on a tide-locked oxygen world around a red dwarf. However, no detail is given beyond that it was about 1 terrestrial mass, a little colder, and used red dwarf sunlight.
 Nemesis: Isaac Asimov avoids the tidal effect issues of the red dwarf Nemesis by making the habitable "planet" a satellite of a gas giant which is tidally locked to the star.
 Star Maker: In Olaf Stapledon's 1937 science fiction novel Star Maker, one of the many alien civilizations in the Milky Way he describes is located in the terminator zone of a tidally locked planet of a red dwarf system. This planet is inhabited by intelligent plants that look like carrots with arms, legs, and a head, which "sleep" part of the time by inserting themselves in soil on plots of land and absorbing sunlight through photosynthesis, and which are awake part of the time, emerging from their plots of soil as locomoting beings who participate in all the complex activities of a modern industrial civilization. Stapledon also describes how life evolved on this planet.
 Superman: Superman's home, Krypton, was in orbit around a red star called Rao which in some stories is described as being a red dwarf, although it is more often referred to as a red giant.
 Ready Jet Go!: In the children's show Ready Jet Go!, Carrot, Celery and Jet are a family of aliens known as Bortronians who come from Bortron 7, a planet of the fictional red dwarf Bortron. They discovered Earth and the Sun when they picked up a "primitive" radio signal (Episode: "How We Found Your Sun"). They also gave a description of the planets in the Bortronian solar system in a song in the movie Ready Jet Go!: Back to Bortron 7.
 Aurelia This planet, seen in the speculative documentary Extraterrestrial (also known as Alien Worlds), details what scientist theorize alien life could be like on a planet orbiting a red dwarf star.

See also
 Acaryochloris marina
 Astrobiology
 Circumstellar habitable zone
 Gliese 581g
 Habitability of K-type main-sequence star systems
 Habitability of neutron star systems
 Habitability of yellow dwarf systems
 Kepler-186f
 Planetary habitability
 SETI

References

Further reading

External links
 

Red dwarf systems
Red dwarfs